La Quinta High School can refer to:

La Quinta High School (La Quinta, California)
La Quinta High School (Westminster, California)